Kachuyeh (also Romanized as Kachūyeh and Kachooyeh) is a village in Jangal Rural District, in the Central District of Fasa County, Fars Province, Iran. At the 2006 census, its population was 664, in 182 families.

References 

Populated places in Fasa County